The 1944 Tennessee Volunteers (variously Tennessee, UT, or the Vols) represented the University of Tennessee in the 1944 college football season. Playing as a member of the Southeastern Conference (SEC), the team was led by head coach John Barnhill, in his third year, and played their home games at Shields–Watkins Field in Knoxville, Tennessee. They finished the season with a record of seven wins, one loss and one tie (7–1–1 overall, 5–0–1 in the SEC), and concluded the season with a loss against USC in the 1945 Rose Bowl.

Schedule

Team players drafted into the NFL

References:

References

Tennessee
Tennessee Volunteers football seasons
Tennessee Volunteers football